The Canadian Motorsport Hall of Fame (CMHF) is a hall of fame run by the Canadian Motorsport Heritage Foundation as a not-for-profit charitable institution that "honours and recognizes the achievements of individuals and institutions that have made outstanding contributions to Canadian motorsport as drivers, owners, team members, motorsport builders, sponsors and significant contributors, as well as those who have distinguished themselves in the new Media category." It was established in 1992 by Gary Magwood and Lee Abrahamson, with assistance by Automobile Journalists Association of Canada founding president and motorsport reporter Len Coates, to celebrate the accomplishments and contributions of the various Canadian motorsports communities. The CMHF has moved location six times over the course of its history due to difficulties garnering sponsorship and community support creating financial trouble, and has been housed at The Canadian Motorsport Heritage Museum, in Toronto's Downsview Park since 2010. 

Inductees are received by a panel of motorsport experts from the CMHF Nomination Committee. Normally, all inductees have to been retired from competition for at least three years or have been active in motorsports for about a quarter of a century. The long, public nomination process allows submissions to be sent to the nomination committee of the CMHF's legal administrators, the Canadian Automotive Collection (CAC), which passes the successful nominees to its independent, expert Selection Committee. A subsequent ballot determining the submissions list by an independent scoring process system for nomination evaluation by each Selection Committee member is presented to the CAC and the CMHF for ratification following the conclusion of the public nomination procedure. The board subsequently determines a cut-off score when it opts to identify all candidates in a given year and then the inductees' names are presented to them. Each successful inductee is contacted by the chair of the board before their names are publicly released. Before that, Abrahamson and Magwood wrote to associations and senior Canadian motorsports clubs asking for nominees, with an eight or ten-person experienced journalist standing committee choosing the inductees.

There are five main types of category of which inductees are placed into: Competitors, Motorsport Builders, Team Members, Significant Contributors and the Media. The CMHF established an additional international category in 2009 to recognize "significant contributions to motorsports in Canada" and "prominent international figures". Each inductee receives a personal plaque bearing the CMHF logo and one on the mezzanine inside the CMHF for listing purposes. Articles and photographs detailing the inductees' achievements are put on display in the hall of fame and there are various displays inside it. The inaugural induction gala dinner ceremony to honour inductees took place at the Four Seasons Hotel Yorkville, in Toronto, Ontario, August 19, 1993, and since 2019 has been held annually as part of the Canadian International AutoShow in Toronto after it was staged as a late-year unincorporated ceremony for most of its history. There was no induction in 2009 as a result of the economic constraints caused by the Great Recession in North America forcing the CMHF's board of directors opting to postpone the ceremony to the following year.

Since 1993, a total of 230 individuals from the world of motorsport have been inducted, with between five to fifteen auto racing figures added each year. The vast majority are men; there have been eight women who have been elected to the CMHF. Kay Petre became the first woman racing driver to be named an inductee in 1995, and the two most recent women to be added to the CMHF were Nathalie Richard and Anne Roy in 2020. The first inducted physician was Hugh E. Scully in 2000. Hydroplane drivers Robert Theoret and Jean Theoret are the only two brothers to have been inducted individually in 2006 and 2010 respectively. The 2018 class was the first to composed wholly of print and broadcast motorsport journalists. The CMHF contains nine organizations and on seven occasions there have been two or more inductees grouped for their combined work. Of the international inductees, they include Carroll Shelby (2009), Bobby Rahal (2010), Sid Watkins (2010), Michael Andretti (2011), Mario Andretti (2012), Nigel Mansell (2013), Jackie Stewart (2014), Multimatic Motorsports (2015), Legendary Motorcar (2016), Honda (2017) and McLaren (2019).

Inductees

Notes

References

External links
 

Motorsport in Canada
Auto racing organizations
Halls of fame in Canada
Sports museums in Canada
Automobile museums in Ontario
Museums in Toronto
Canadian sports trophies and awards
Auto racing museums and halls of fame